In Uzbek football, the Club 200 of Berador Abduraimov is club of the best goalscorers with over 200 goals in the history of Uzbek football. The club is named after the famous Pakhtakor player, Berador Abduraimov.

History

The "Club 200 of Berador Abduraimov" was founded 2001 by an initiative of the Uzbekistan Football Federation and football magazine "Nash Futbol". Figure 200 in the name of the club derives from the number of goals scored by Berador Abduraimov, one of the best strikers and football legends in Uzbek football.

List of players
The club members are sorted by birth date.

See also
 Grigory Fedotov club
 Gennadi Krasnitsky club

References

Uzbekistani football trophies and awards
Lists of footballers in Uzbekistan
Association football player non-biographical articles